Soldier Soldier is a British television drama series. The title comes from a traditional song of the same name - "Soldier, soldier won't you marry me, with your musket, fife and drum?" -  an instrumental version of which was used as its theme music.

Created by Lucy Gannon, produced by Central Television and broadcast on the ITV network, it ran for a total of seven series and 82 episodes from 10 June 1991 to 9 December 1997. It featured the daily lives of a group of soldiers in 'B' Company, 1st Battalion The King's Fusiliers, a fictional British Army infantry regiment loosely based on the Royal Regiment of Fusiliers.

Set in the immediate aftermath of the Cold War, it is a dramatisation of army life in the early to mid-1990s, when the British Army was undergoing significant change. This is perhaps best demonstrated during the third series, around 1994, when a significant number of real regiments were forced into amalgamations with one another due to downsizing of the army. Within the world of Soldier Soldier, the King's Fusiliers are forced to amalgamate with the Cumbrian Regiment, another fictional regiment, becoming the King's Own Fusiliers. At the time Soldier Soldier was broadcast, the fatality rate was low, with most casualties due to training accidents and suicides. The military as a whole was assigned to performing more peacekeeping missions than actually doing any fighting. As a consequence, the show served well to portray the army, despite the domestic problems that could occur, in a fairly good light.

Although many well known and not so well known actors appeared in Soldier Soldier over the period it was broadcast, perhaps the best known are Robson Green and Jerome Flynn, who portrayed Fusilier Dave Tucker and Sergeant Paddy Garvey respectively. It was their performance of "Unchained Melody" in an episode of the 4th series that propelled them to stardom, giving them several number one songs and a best selling album.  At the end of the fifth series in 1995, both actors left the show. After a decline in viewing figures (following their departure), 1997 saw the decision to end the drama after seven series.

TV presenter Chris Kelly wrote and produced some episodes of the series.

Regular cast

Military personnel

Officers
Miles Anderson as Lieutenant Colonel Dan Fortune (Series 1-2)
Patrick Drury as General Levy (Series 3)
Robert Gwilym as Lieutenant Colonel Nick Hammond (Series 3)
John Bowe as Lieutenant Colonel Ian Jennings (Series 4)
Duncan Bell as Lieutenant Colonel Paul Philips (Series 5)
Philip Bowen as Lieutenant Colonel Mike Eastwood (Series 6)
James Cosmo as Lieutenant Colonel Philip Drysdale (Series 7)
William Gaminara as Major Harry "Dickie" Bird (Series 1)
David Haig as Major Tom Cadman (Series 1)
Simon Donald as Major Bob Cochrane (Series 2)
Adrian Rawlins as Major Tim Radley (Series 3)
Dougray Scott as Major Rory Taylor (Series 5)
James Callis as Major Tim Forrester (Series 6)
Dorian Healy as Captain (later Major) Kieran Voce (Series 3-4)
Peter Wingfield as Lieutenant Nick Pasco (Series 1)
Angus Macfadyen as Second Lieutenant Alex Pereira (Series 2)
Ben Nealon as Second Lieutenant (later Lieutenant, then Captain) Jeremy Forsythe (Series 4-7)

Warrant officers
Sean Baker as Company Sergeant Major Chick Henwood (Series 1)
Rob Spendlove as Company Sergeant Major (later Regimental Sergeant Major, then Lieutenant) Michael Stubbs (Series 3-5)
Conor Mullen as Company Sergeant Major Alan Fitzpatrick (Series 7)

Non-commissioned officers (NCOs)
Robert Glenister as Colour Sergeant (later Lieutenant) Ian Anderson (Series 1)
Richard Dillane as Sergeant Brad Connor (Series 5)
Jonathan Guy Lewis as Sergeant Chris McCleod (Series 6-7)
Gary Love as Corporal  (later Sergeant, and then Corporal again) Anthony "Tony" Wilton (Series 1-4)
Razaaq Adoti as Corporal William Markham (Series 5)
Ian Curtis as Corporal Mark Hobbs (Series 6-7)
Jerome Flynn as Lance Corporal (later Corporal, and then Sergeant, and then Corporal again) Patrick "Paddy" Garvey (Series 1-5)
Shaun Dingwall as Lance Corporal Steve Evans (Series 5-6)

Fusiliers
Winston Crooke as Fusilier Joe Meakin (Series 1)
Robson Green as Fusilier (later briefly Lance Corporal) David "Dave" Tucker (Series 1-5)
Mo Sesay as Fusilier Michael "Midnight" Rawlings (Series 2-3)
Akim Mogaji as Fusilier Luke Roberts (Series 3)
Jack Deam as Fusilier Vinny Bowles (Series 3)
David Groves as Fusilier Joe Farrell (Series 4-6)
Paterson Joseph as Fusilier Eddie "Horatio" Nelson (Series 4)
Danny Cunningham as Fusilier Andy Butcher (Series 5-7)
Simon Sherlock as Fusilier Mel Briggs (Series 5-6)
Thomas Craig as Fusilier Jacko Barton (Series 7)
Chris Gascoyne as Fusilier Tony Rossi (Series 7)

Attached arms
Richard Hampton as Reverend (CF3) Simon Armstrong RAChD (Series 1-2)
John McGlynn as Major James McCudden (Series 4)
Lucy Cohu as Major Jessica Bailey AGC (Series 7)
Sophie Dix as Captain Sadie Williams RAMC (Series 5)
Lesley Vickerage as Second Lieutenant (later Lieutenant, and then Captain) Kate Butler (later Voce) AGC (Series 2-4)
Biddy Hodson as Second Lieutenant Samantha Sheridan AGC (Series 6)
Debra Beaumont as Sergeant Sally Hawkins (Series 4)
Fiona Bell as Sergeant Angela McCleod AGC (Series 6-7)
Holly Aird as Corporal (later Sergeant) Nancy Thorpe (later Garvey, then Thorpe, then Garvey) RMP (Series 1-3, 5)
Ross O'Hennessy as Corporal Dando APTC (series 5, 7)
Kate O'Malley as Private Stacey Grey (later Butcher) RLC (Series 6-7)

Civilians
Melanie Kilburn as Carol Anderson (Series 1)
Samantha Morton as Clare Anderson (Series 1)
Gareth Parrington as James Anderson (Series 1)
Cathryn Harrison as Laura Cadman (Series 1)
Susan Franklyn as Juliet Grant (Series 1)
Rosie Rowell as Donna Tucker (Series 1-5)
Annabelle Apsion as Joy Wilton (Series 1-5)
Matthew Beard/David Gallivan/Sonny Dudley/Luke Burt as Matthew Wilton (Series 1-5)
Lesley Manville as Rachel Fortune (née Elliot) (Series 2)
Lena Headey as Shenna Bowles (Series 3)
Marise Wipani as Ellie (Series 3)
Suzanne Burden as Sandra Radley (Series 3)
Rakie Ayola as Bernie Roberts (Series 3)
William Ash as Jack Stubbs (Series 3-4)
Denise Welch as Marsha Stubbs (Series 3-5)
Tara Simpson as Sarah Stubbs (Series 3-4)
Angela Clarke as Colette Daly (Series 4-5)
Gabrielle Reidy as Isabelle Jennings (Series 4)
Ellis Fernandez/Milo Taylor as Macaulay Tucker (Series 4-5)
Nthati Moshesh as Lilian Malanje (later Forsythe) (Series 5-7)
Alison Skilbeck as Dr Sarah Eastwood (Series 6)
Kate Ashfield as Cate Hobbs (Series 6)
Laura Howard as Deborah Osbourne (later Briggs) (Series 6)
Kelly Hunter as Jackie Reece (Series 6)
Joanna Phillips-Lane as Karen Fitzpatrick (Series 7)
Lee Ingleby as Kevin Fitzpatrick (Series 7)
Sarah Smart as Lucy Fitzpatrick (Series 7)
Michelle Butterly as Julie Oldroyd (Series 7)

Episodes

Series 1
1991. Following a six-month tour in Northern Ireland, the King's Fusiliers return to duty at their Midlands headquarters.

"All the King's Men" (10 June 1991)
"Fun and Games" (17 June 1991)
"Dirty Work" (24 June 1991)
"Fighting Spirit" (1 July 1991)
"Battlefields" (8 July 1991)
"Loyal to the Corps" (15 July 1991)
"Flying Colours" (22 July 1991)

Series 2
Series 2, 1992, was set in Hong Kong, apart from the first two episodes.

"A Man's Life" (21 September 1992)
"Something Old, Something New" (28 September 1992)
"A Touch of the Sun" (5 October 1992)
"Lifelines" (12 October 1992)
"Saving Face" (19 October 1992)
"Lost and Found" (26 October 1992)
"The Last Post" (2 November 1992)

Series 3
Series 3, 1993 was set in New Zealand & Germany.

"Shifting Sands" (7 September 1993)
"Live Fire" (14 September 1993)
"Base Details" (21 September 1993)
"Fall Out" (28 September 1993)
"Disintegration" (5 October 1993)
"Hide and Seek" (12 October 1993)
"Trouble and Strife" (19 October 1993)
"Hard Knocks" (26 October 1993)
"Camouflage" (2 November 1993)
"Staying Together" (9 November 1993)
"Dutch Courage" (16 November 1993)
"Stand by Me" (23 November 1993)
"Leaving" (30 November 1993)

Series 4
Series 4, 1994, was set in Cyprus, Germany and the UK.

"Stormy Weather" (20 September 1994)
"Away Games" (27 September 1994)
"Damage" (4 October 1994)
"Second Sight" (11 October 1994)
"Over the Top" (18 October 1994)
"Proud Man" (25 October 1994)
"Further Education" (1 November 1994)
"Baby Love" (8 November 1994)
"Band of Gold" (15 November 1994)
"Going Back" (22 November 1994)
"Poles Apart" (29 November 1994)
"Bombshell" (6 December 1994)
"Changing the Guard" (13 December 1994)

Series 5
Series 5, 1995 was set in Australia, UK & South Africa.

"For Better, For Worse" (5 September 1995)
"Second Chances" (12 September 1995)
"Love Not Money" (19 September 1995)
"Bushed" (26 September 1995)
"Far Away" (3 October 1995)
"Ill Wind" (10 October 1995)
"Sweet Revenge" (17 October 1995)
"The Army Game" (24 October 1995)
"Love and War" (31 October 1995)
"Leaving" (7 November 1995)
"Hard Lessons" (14 November 1995)
"Stick Together" (21 November 1995)
"Under the Sun" (28 November 1995)
"Baptism of Fire" (5 December 1995)
"Twist of Fate" (12 December 1995)

Series 6
Series 6, 1996, was set in the UK, except the penultimate episode which was set on a fictional island in the South Atlantic.

"River Deep" (3 September 1996)
"Divided Loyalties" (10 September 1996)
"All for One" (17 September 1996)
"Walking on Air" (24 September 1996)
"Under the Gooseberry Bush" (1 October 1996)
"Flash Point" (8 October 1996)
"Money For Nothing" (15 October 1996)
"Dear Joe" (22 October 1996)
"Asking for it?" (29 October 1996)
"Delayed Action" (5 November 1996)
"Beast" (12 November 1996)
"Fall for Love" (19 November 1996)
"War Path" (26 November 1996)
"Deliver us from Evil" (3 December 1996)
"Hell and High Water" (10 December 1996)

Series 7
Series 7, 1997, was set in the UK, except episode 10 which was set in Africa.

"Divided We Fall" (23 September 1997)
"Things Can Only Get Better!" (30 September 1997)
"Line of Departure" (7 October 1997)
"Under Fire" (14 October 1997)
"Friends and Lovers" (21 October 1997)
"How Was it for You?" (28 October 1997)
"The Road to Damascus" (4 November 1997)
"Out" (11 November 1997)
"Fit to Explode" (18 November 1997)
"Chain of Command" (25 November 1997)
"Sounds of War" (2 December 1997)
"No Pain, No Gain!" (9 December 1997)

Regiment

The King's Own Fusiliers, originally the King's Fusiliers, is the infantry regiment portrayed in the series. Like all fusilier regiments, both the "King's" and the "King's Own" wear a hackle in its head-dress; this is coloured dark blue over white. During the third series of Soldier Soldier, which took place during the Options for Change military reforms, the King's Fusiliers was forced to amalgamate with another regiment, "The Cumbrians (Duke of Rutland's Own)". During negotiations with the commanding officer of the other regiment to be merged (over which customs and traditions should be carried over to the new regiment), attempts were made by the Cumbrians to keep the new regiment as an ordinary infantry regiment, rather than a fusilier regiment (which would also see the loss of the King's hackle). However, research by the regimental commander of the King's Fusiliers (Lt. Col. Osbourne) found that, during the Cumbrians [fictional] service in the Crimea, the Cumbrians had worn the hackle and served as fusiliers for 6 months in honour of the fusiliers that had served alongside them. As a result, the new regiment was named "The King's Own Fusiliers".

The cap badge of the King's Own Fusiliers features the lion surmounting the crown, which is the recognised symbol of the British Army, within the band of the Order of the Garter. Surmounting the garter band is the traditional flame that indicates a fusilier regiment. (Coincidentally, in series 1 episode 2 of Red Cap, the Royal Cambrian Fusiliers wore the same cap badge and hackle as the King's Own Fusiliers).

Role
As an ordinary infantry battalion, the King's Fusiliers/King's Own Fusiliers was in the arms plot rotation, and thus participated in a number of different roles: 
1st Battalion, King's Fusiliers
Light infantry battalion in the UK
Resident infantry battalion in Hong Kong (with training deployment to New Zealand)
1st Battalion, King's Own Fusiliers
Armoured infantry battalion with 4th (Armoured) Brigade in Germany
United Nations peacekeepers with UNPROFOR in Bosnia
Public duties battalion in Windsor
Infantry training battalion Warminster
Air assault infantry battalion with 5th (Airborne) Brigade

During its time in Windsor, in addition to other duties, the King's Own Fusiliers provided the guard at Buckingham Palace, the Tower of London and Windsor Castle.

Recruiting area

As the King's Fusiliers / King's Own Fusiliers has no geographical location in its name, it can only be speculated what recruiting area it represents. In early episodes, the senior officers discuss the possibility of being amalgamated with other regiments from the Midlands. During Series 1, the possibility of merging or disbanding regiments is discussed, and at that point, the Cumbrians and the Rutlands are expected to be amalgamated. During the final episode of series 2, the regiment's commanding officer announces orders for the King's Fusiliers to form a new 'Midlands Regiment' along with the Cumbrians and the Rutlands (though in later episodes, the other regiment to be merged is referred to as The Cumbrians (Duke of Rutland's Own).

Other anecdotal references in the series also point to the regiment's location being in the Midlands include the use of a Midlands commercial radio station being played by various characters (BRMB) and local (specifically Birmingham) telephone area code on signage and vehicles. However, given that the series was made in the Midlands by the 'Central Films' division of Central Television, these local references can be expected.

Commanding officers
1st Battalion, King's Fusiliers
Lt Colonel D. Fortune (1991–1992) (Miles Anderson (Series 1 & 2)) A mild mannered man who is nonetheless a firm disciplinarian. Fortune is a widower (having lost (off-screen) his first wife to cancer). Between the 1st & 2nd series, he meets and then (in series 2) marries a journalist (Rachel Fortune (née Elliot)). After receiving orders for the regiment to be amalgamated, he decides to retire from the Army. 
Lt Colonel M. Osbourne (1992–1993) (Patrick Drury (Series 3)) Succeeding Lt Col Fortune, his command of the regiment mainly occurs during the time off-screen between series (only appearing in 3 episodes of series 3). After helping negotiate the regimental merger, he resigns his commission in order to spend more time with his daughter.
1st Battalion, King's Own Fusiliers
Lt Colonel N. Hammond (1993–1994) (Robert Gwilliem (Series 3)) A keen and ambitious officer, who takes command of the new King's Own Fusiliers during their posting in Germany. A no nonsense man who makes his mark by having LCpl Tucker demoted for bringing the regiment into disrepute. After taking the regiment to Bosnia on NATO peacekeeping duties, he hands over control to Lt Col Jennings. 
Lt Colonel I. Jennings (1994–1995) (John Bowe (Series 4)) Jennings assumes command from Hammond upon the regiment's return from Bosnia. His first task being the presentation of the UN Medals. The major assignment being the regiments relocation from Munster in Germany to Windsor. Also the Regiment is assigned to Public Duties Guarding locations such as Buckingham Palace and The Tower of London.
Lt Colonel P. Philips (1995–1996) (Duncan Bell (Series 5)) The regiment's youngest commanding officer, Philips is an approachable man but nevertheless a stickler for regulations, adhering without doubt to the army's anti-gay regulations on discovering two of his men are in a relationship. Despite this, he bends regulations himself by starting a relationship with Captain Sadie Williams, the medical officer.
Lt Colonel M. Eastwood (1996–1997) (Philip Bowen (Series 6)) An older man who is married with stepchildren, Eastwood has an avuncular nature and takes on something of a fatherly role to the men. He leads the regiment into combat when the British protectorate Deliverance Island is invaded but loses a leg to a land mine during the operation and retires soon afterwards.
Lt Colonel P. Drysdale (1997) (James Cosmo (Series 7)) A combat veteran, Drysdale alienates most of the other officers and some of the men with his brusque style, especially when he withholds information during an exercise that leads to a civilian volunteer being injured. After a disastrous peacekeeping operation in Zokindi, where his decisions result in a group being captured and three men killed, he is court martialled for failing to follow the chain of command and resigns.

Fictional regiments featured in Soldier Soldier
The King's Fusiliers (later the King's Own Fusiliers)
The Cumbrians (Duke of Rutland's Own) - amalgamates with the King's Fusiliers
The Malvern Regiment - exercises with the King's Fusiliers during their time in Germany

See also
Red Cap
Spearhead
 Ultimate Force – Focuses on the British Army's Special Air Service.

References

External links

Soldier Soldier at The Robson Green Web Site.
 Soldier Soldier: Deliver Us From Evil w/Jason O'Mara  - caps/script

ITV television dramas
Television series by ITV Studios
British military television series
1990s British drama television series
1991 British television series debuts
1997 British television series endings
English-language television shows
Television shows produced by Central Independent Television
Television series by South Pacific Pictures